Utsjoki is a municipality in Finland, the northernmost in the country. It is in Lapland and borders Norway as well as the municipality of Inari. The municipality was founded in 1876. It has a population of 
which 
is water. The population density is
.

Utsjoki has two official languages: Finnish and Northern Sami. It is the municipality in Finland with the largest portion of official Sami speakers;  of the population.

The border with Norway follows the river Teno, which flows into the Arctic Sea. The northernmost village in Finland and in the European Union is Nuorgam, which is also the northernmost land border crossing in the world.

Utsjoki is at the northern end of highway 4, the longest highway in Finland. The European route E75 runs along the Sami Bridge and continues on to Norway.

The Kevo nature reserve is located within the municipality. The trail partly follows the edge of the Kevo gorge.

Geography

Villages 
 Nuorgam
 Utsjoki centre
 Nuvvus
 Dalvadas
 Outakoski
 Rovisuvanto
 Karigasniemi
 Kaamasmukka

Topography
The Utsjoki region is flatter and lower in altitudes than many other parts of Lapland. Large areas of Utsjoki are less than 300 m above sea level. Many of the fell summits are under 500 m in height. In general, the topography is smooth and the fells slope gently. The summits are very flat and large, as is typical of old peneplain surfaces.

Vegetation
In general, the tree line is located at altitudes between 300 and 400 meters. In northernmost Finland, the tree line on north-facing slopes is just above an altitude of 100 meters. Heaths extend above the tree line. The lower heathlands are dominated by shrubs such as dwarf birch, blueberry and crowberry, whereas the fells, at higher elevations, have dwarf willows and alpine grasses with lichens and mosses. On the fell tops, blockfields and windblown heaths with lichens and mosses as well as bare rock slabs are found. Patterned ground occurs regularly, often as polygons and stone stripes on the slopes.

Climate
The midnight sun remains above the horizon from 17 May to 28 July (73 days), and the polar night from 26 November to 15 January (51 days).
Utsjoki, like most of Finland, has a subarctic climate (Köppen Dfc). Being the northernmost municipality in Finland, Utsjoki's annual average temperature is below freezing. Utsjoki is also the driest place in Finland, as the average annual precipitation varies between 371 and 433 mm, depending on the topography. The driest year on record was 1986, when only 234 mm of precipitation fell at the Outakoski weather station.

Extremely low temperatures and low precipitation result in thin snow cover throughout the winters. The wind velocity strongly increases with higher elevations, and this has a major effect on the distribution of the snow. The exposed hilltops usually have no snow cover during winter. This leads to the cooling of the ground and the development of permafrost.

Permafrost
Palsas are a typical permafrost feature in northern Finland. Permafrost formation in palsas is dictated by the properties of peat. Dry peat is a good insulator during the summer heat, but frozen peat in winter conducts heat outwards, and the winter frost can penetrate deep into the peat layers. Due to these physical properties, palsas may be formed and preserved even in a climate where the mean annual air temperature is just at the freezing point.

Permafrost has been found in many palsa mires in the Kevo and Utsjoki regions. After detailed studies on palsas, researchers were convinced until 1982 that "so far, permafrost has been found, and probably exists only, in mires in the cores of palsas". The permafrost core in palsas is easy to detect by digging or sounding with a steel rod, and the frozen ground necessitates modern geophysical techniques for geoelectrical soundings. They allow measurement of the thickness of frozen bedrock due to its higher specific electrical resistance.

Matti Seppälä (1941-2020) was undoubtedly the foremost expert on palsas. Based on existing innovative research in Scandinavia he suggested to look for the general permafrost distribution in the mountains also in northernmost Finland. The field campaign in summer 1985 in Utsjoki was supported by the Academy of Finland, the University of Helsinki and the German Research Foundation. The results were quite surprising for most scientists in Finland. Above the timber Iine a minimum permafrost thickness of ten to fifty meters was recorded with geoelectrical soundings.

It seems obvious that permafrost is widespread on fjell summits of northern Finland. The Puollamoaivi mountain (432 m high) is located some 13 km NE of the Kevo Subarctic Research Station. Close to the Skallovarri palsa mire about 290 m a. s. I., an estimated permafrost thickness  of over 100 meters may be expected at an altitude of 360 m, just 30–70 m higher than the surface of the palsa mire. It is concluded therefore that all sites on the crest of Skallovarri (Puollamoaivi) show the existence of permafrost, but its thickness seems to be different. These findings were confirmed with similar results in the adjacent Peldojoki, Hietatievat, Peera sites, where permafrost exists in debris as well as in bedrock. This is also of importance in the construction business, e.g. for deep foundations for telecommunication masts.

Notable people
 Inger-Mari Aikio-Arianaick, writer, born in Utsjoki in 1961
 Pigga Keskitalo, Sámi academic, born in Utsjoki in 1972
 Helvi Poutasuo (1943–2017), teacher, translator, editor, politician
 Irja Seurujärvi-Kari (born 1947), politician and academic

Gallery

References

External links 

 Municipality of Utsjoki 
 Hotel Luossajohka Utsjoki

 
Sámi-language municipalities
Populated places established in 1876
1876 establishments in Finland